Thirupathi Narasimhalunaidu Venkatesh (born 23 March 1963), better known by his stage name Rockline Venkatesh, is an Indian actor and producer known for his works in Kannada, and Hindi cinemas. He is the founder and owner of the production and distribution company, Rockline Entertainments which has directed over five films as of 2012. In 2015 he co-produced Bajrangi Bhaijaan which earned the National Film Award for Best Popular Film Providing Wholesome Entertainment at the 63rd National Film Awards.

Career

1990–2010 
Venkatesh began his career as a stuntman, a villain, supporting roles and produced Kannada television serial initially. He started his production venture in 1996 with co production of Ayudha. He has made films with original stories and also remakes from other languages. He has made films with top super stars of Kannada film industry like Dr. Vishnuvardhan, Ambareesh, Ravichandran, Shivaraj Kumar, Upendra, Sudeep, Puneeth Rajkumar, Darshan, Vijay and others and also made a few small budget films. He has used top film directors like Ravichandran, S.V.Rajendra Singh Babu, D.Rajendra Babu, S. Narayan, KV Raju, Om Prakash Rao, MS Rajashekhar, Sadhu Kokila, Dayal Padmanabhan, Meher Ramesh and others. In 2009, When IDBI started financing Kannada films, Rockline Venkatesh one of the initial producers to welcome the bank to Industry. Rockline Productions has now become a brand name in the Kannada film industry which has produced several blockbusters like Preethse, Preethsodh Thappa, Yaare Neenu Cheluve, Ajay, Mourya, Diggajaru, and Dakota Express.

2010 – present 

In 2010, The ongoing buzz was created when it was said superstar Upendra is directing a movie after 10 years, Rockline Venkatesh produced the movie and its said that they spend lakhs of money on photoshoot itself. And in late 2013, after making films like Super, Preethse and Maurya, Venkatesh was very keen to remake Tamil film Soodhu Kavvum in Kannada. Later it was mentioned that Rohit Shetty from Hindi film industry would direct the Hindi version of the film. Recently Venkatesh has been seen working with superstars from various industries, he made his debut as a Telugu film producer with 2014's Power, starring Ravi Teja, Lingaa starring Rajnikanth which released in various languages and in 2015 he associated with Bollywood's superstar Salman Khan for the film Bajrangi Bhaijaan which emerged as a commercial success grossing over ₹6.25 billion worldwide and in the process and became the third highest grossing Indian film after PK and Baahubali.

On New Year's Eve 2015, Killing Veerappan by Ram Gopal Varma was released. Rockline Venkatesh has keyed well in the prominent role as a police officer (where he has performed police roles in movies such as Agni IPS and Police Story) who becomes one of the victim to the killings of Veerappan.

In mid 2016 Rockline Venkatesh acquired the remake rights of Marathi blockbuster Sairat for four southern languages. Sairat, the critically acclaimed love story is the first Marathi film to gross over ₹100 crore (US$15 million) worldwide. Rinku Rajguru, heroine of the Marathi film Sairat will make Sandalwood debut with the Kannada version directed by S Narayan.

In January 2017, Rockline Venkatesh's first Malayalam film was announced. The film, starring Mohanlal and Manju Warrier, was directed by B. Unnikrishnan while Tamil actor Vishal  has been cast as the main villain.

Filmography 
Producer

Actor
 Snehada Kadalalli (1992)
 Ananda Jyothi (1993)
 Police Story (1996)
 Agni IPS (1997)
 Dakota Express (2002)
 Kaamannana Makkalu (2006)
 Police Story 2 (2007)
 Killing Veerappan (2016)
 Naachiyaar (2018; Tamil)
 8MM Bullet (2018)

References

External links 
 
 

1963 births
Living people
Film producers from Bangalore
Male actors in Kannada cinema
Indian male film actors
Kannada film producers
Tamil film producers
Male actors from Bangalore
20th-century Indian male actors
21st-century Indian male actors
Male actors in Tamil cinema
Producers who won the Best Popular Film Providing Wholesome Entertainment National Film Award